God Say is a 2017 Indian Malayalam-language comedy drama film directed by Shyju Govind and Sherry Govindan. The film is produced by Santhosh Manikkoth and E.P Dinesh Nambiar under the banner of Snehanjali Productions. It stars Vinay Forrt, Mythili and Joy Mathew in the lead roles. The film was released on 7 January 2017.

Plot 
The film which is set in the background of early nineties of Kozhikode portrays the life of Harischandran (Vinay Forrt), an anarchist and a drunkard, who is an employee at the Aakashvani radio station. His life changes totally when he starts anchoring the programme named "Gandhimargam" and starts following Gandhism.

Cast 
 Vinay Forrt as Harichandran
 Mythili as Magdalene Gomez
 Joy Mathew
 Mamukkoya
 Indrans
 Vinod Kovoor
 Santhosh Keezhattoor
 Surjith

References

External links

2017 films
2010s Malayalam-language films
Indian comedy-drama films
Films shot in Kozhikode
2017 comedy-drama films